Alan Stuart Blinder (born October 14, 1945) is an American economics professor at Princeton University and is listed among the most influential economists in the world according to IDEAS/RePEc. He is a leading macroeconomist, politically liberal, and a champion of Keynesian economics and policies.

Binder served on President Bill Clinton's Council of Economic Advisers from January 1993 to June 1994 and as the vice chairman of the Federal Reserve from June 1994 to January 1996.

His academic work has focused particularly on monetary policy and central banking, and on the "offshoring" of jobs. His writing has been published in The New York Times, The Washington Post, as well as a monthly column in The Wall Street Journal. Regarding the financial crisis of 2007–2008, Blinder drew ten lessons for fellow economists, including “It can happen here” and “Fraud and near-fraud can rise to attain macroeconomic significance.”

Early life
Blinder was born to a Jewish family in Brooklyn, New York. He graduated from Syosset High School in Syosset, New York. Blinder attended Princeton University as an undergraduate student and graduated summa cum laude with a B.A. in economics in 1967. He completed a 130-page long senior thesis, titled "The Theory of Corporate Choice". He received an MSc in economics from the London School of Economics in 1968 and received a doctorate in economics from the Massachusetts Institute of Technology in 1971. He was advised by Robert Solow.

Professional life

Academic career
Blinder is the Gordon S. Rentschler Memorial Professor of Economics and Public Affairs at Princeton where he has been since 1971; from 1988 to 1990, he chaired the economics department. Also in 1990, he founded Princeton's Griswold Center for Economic Policy Studies. And he has served as vice-chair of The Observatory Group.

Since 1978, Blinder has been a Research Associate of the National Bureau of Economic Research. He is a past president of the Eastern Economic Association and Vice President of the American Economic Association and was named a Distinguished Fellow of the latter in 2011. He is a Fellow of the American Academy of Arts and Sciences (since 1991), a member of the American Philosophical Society since 1996, and a member of the board of the Council on Foreign Relations (since 2008). Blinder's textbook Economics: Principles and Policy, co-written with William Baumol, was first published in 1979 and, in 2012 was printed in its twelfth edition.

In 2009 Blinder was inducted into the American Academy of Political and Social Science, "for his distinguished scholarship on fiscal policy, monetary policy and the distribution of income, and for consistently bringing that knowledge to bear on the public arena." He is a strong proponent of free trade. Blinder has been critical of the public discussion of the US national debt, describing it as generally ranging from "ludicrous to horrific".

Political career
In 1975, Blinder served as the Deputy Assistant Director of the Congressional Budget Office.

In the 1990s, he served on President Bill Clinton's Council of Economic Advisers from January 1993 to June 1994, and as the 15th Vice Chair of the Federal Reserve from June 27, 1994, to January 31, 1996 (more specifically as the Vice Chairman of Board of Governors of the Federal Reserve System).

As Vice Chairman, Blinder cautioned against raising interest rates too quickly to slow inflation because of the lags in earlier rises feeding through into the economy. He also warned against ignoring the short term costs in terms of unemployment that inflation-fighting could cause.

Many have argued that Blinder's stint at the Fed was cut short because of his tendency to challenge chairman Alan Greenspan. In particular, by challenging assumptions, Blinder disrupted “the whole pipeline of Greenspan-arriving-at-decisions.”

He was an adviser to Al Gore and John Kerry during their respective presidential campaigns in 2000 and 2004.

"Cash for Clunkers"

Blinder was an early advocate of a "Cash for Clunkers" program, in which the government buys some of the oldest, most-polluting vehicles and scraps them. In July 2008, he wrote an article in The New York Times advocating such a program, which was implemented by the Obama administration during the summer of 2009. Blinder asserted it could stimulate the economy, benefit the environment, and reduce income inequality. The program was praised by President Obama for "exceeding expectations," but criticized for economic and environmental reasons.

Private sector
Blinder was a co-founder and a vice-chair of the Promontory Interfinancial Network, LLC.

After his service as the vice chairman of the Federal Reserve, Blinder, along with several former regulators, founded a company that offers a number of services that provide a means for depositors (including governmental entities, nonprofits, businesses, as well as individuals such as retirees) to access millions in Federal Deposit Insurance Corporation (FDIC) coverage at a single institution instead of multiple ones. This provides banks that are members the ability to offer coverage above the FDIC per account/per bank limit by letting those banks place funds into CDs or deposit accounts issued by other network banks. This occurs in increments below the standard FDIC insurance maximum ($250,000) so that both principal and interest are eligible for FDIC insurance. The company acts as a sort of clearinghouse, matching deposits from one institution with another. Through its services it allows access to higher levels of FDIC insurance although limits apply.

Views regarding 2008 near-meltdown of major financial institutions

Blinder draws 10 lessons for fellow economists in a 2014 article entitled "What Did We Learn from the Financial Crisis, the Great Recession, and the Pathetic Recovery?” which include:
5) Fraud and near-fraud can rise to attain macroeconomic significance.
“ . .  I think most of us thought that fraud and near-fraud were in the rounding error—not something that could have consequences on a macroeconomic scale. We were wrong. . ”
6) Excessive complexity is not just anti-competitive, it's dangerous.
“ . . When the crash comes, losses may therefore be much larger than investors dreamed imaginable. Markets may dry up as no one knows what these securities are really worth. Panic may set in. Thus complexity per se is a source of risk.”
7) Go-for-broke incentives will induce traders to go for broke.
“We had to learn this? Apparently so.
“In the years prior to the crisis, banks, investment banks, and hedge funds often compensated their traders in ways that offered fabulous riches for success but comparative slaps on the wrist for failure. . ”

 Is economics "barking up the wrong tree" by focusing so heavily on consumption, and not on jobs? 

In a 2019 article entitled "The Free-Trade Paradox: The Bad Politics of a Good Idea," Blinder states that the main focus of the economics profession has been on how to use price signals to produce goods and services as cheaply as possible and how to distribute these goods and services (also using price signals). Jobs are viewed as secondary at best, and in fact often as a distinct negative and as something people put up with only to get the money to afford their own consumption.

Blinder writes, “What if people care as much (or more) about their role as producers -- about their jobs -- as they do about the goods and services they consume? That would mean economists have been barking up the wrong tree for more than two centuries.”

Blinder still thinks there’s an excellent case to be made in favor of trade, but it’s not the case economists typically make.

Selected works
 (2022), A Monetary and Fiscal History of the United States, 1961–2021, Princeton University Press.
 (2014), "What Did We Learn from the Financial Crisis, the Great Recession, and the Pathetic Recovery?" Princeton University Griswold Center for Economic Policy Studies Working Paper No. 243, 22-page paper, November 2014.
 (2013), After the Music Stopped: The Financial Crisis, the Response, and the Work Ahead, New York: Penguin Press, 24 Jan. 2013. ISBN is 978-1594205309.
 (2009), "How Many U.S. Jobs Might Be Offshorable," World Economics, April–June 2009, 10(2): 41–78.
 (2009), "Making Monetary Policy by Committee," International Finance, Summer 2009, 12(2): 171–194.
 (2008), "Do Monetary Policy Committees Need Leaders? A Report on an Experiment," American Economic Review (Papers and Proceedings), May 2008, pp. 224–229.
 (2006), "Offshoring: The Next Industrial Revolution?" Foreign Affairs", March/April 2006, pp. 113–128. (A longer version with footnotes and references is "Fear of Offshoring," CEPS Working Paper No. 119, December 2005).
 (2006), "The Case Against the Case Against Discretionary Fiscal Policy," in R. Kopcke, G. Tootell, and R. Triest (eds.), The Macroeconomics of Fiscal Policy, MIT Press, 2006, forthcoming, pp. 25–61.
 (2004), The Quiet Revolution, Yale University Press
 (2001, with William Baumol and Edward N. Wolff), Downsizing in America: Reality, Causes, And Consequences, Russell Sage Foundation
 (2001, with Janet Yellen), The Fabulous Decade: Macroeconomic Lessons from the 1990s, New York: The Century Foundation Press
 (1998, with E. Canetti, D. Lebow, and J. Rudd), Asking About Prices: A New Approach to Understanding Price Stickiness, Russell Sage Foundation
 (1998), Central Banking in Theory and Practice, MIT Press
 (1991), Growing Together: An Alternative Economic Strategy for the 1990s, Whittle
 (1990, ed.), Paying for Productivity, Brookings
 (1989), Macroeconomics Under Debate, Harvester-Wheatsheaf
 (1989), Inventory Theory and Consumer Behavior, Harvester-Wheatsheaf
 (1987), Hard Heads, Soft Hearts: Tough‑Minded Economics for a Just Society, Addison-Wesley
 (1983), Economic Opinion, Private Pensions and Public Pensions: Theory and Fact. The University of Michigan
 (1979, with William Baumol), Economics: Principles and Policy – textbook
 (1979), Economic Policy and the Great Stagflation. New York: Academic Press
 (co-edited with Philip Friedman, 1977), Natural Resources, Uncertainty and General Equilibrium Systems: Essays in Memory of Rafael Lusky, New York: Academic Press
 (1974), Toward an Economic Theory of Income Distribution'', MIT Press

See also
 Antifragile#The Alan Blinder problem

References

External links

 Blinder's Princeton homepage
 Academic articles
 Op Eds
 After the Music Stops: The Financial Crisis, the Response, and the Work Ahead  at Penguin Publishers
 Promontory Interfinancial Network, LLC
 
 
 
 Statements and Speeches of Alan S. Blinder
 

1945 births
20th-century American economists
21st-century American economists
Alumni of the London School of Economics
20th-century American Jews
The Century Foundation
Distinguished Fellows of the American Economic Association
Economists from New York (state)
Fellows of the American Academy of Arts and Sciences
Fellows of the Econometric Society
Living people
New Keynesian economists
People from Brooklyn
People from Syosset, New York
Princeton University alumni
Princeton University faculty
Syosset High School alumni
United States Council of Economic Advisers
Vice Chairs of the Federal Reserve
Clinton administration personnel
21st-century American Jews
Brookings Institution people
Members of the American Philosophical Society